Felipe Galindo Chávez y Pineda (July 13, 1641 – July 12, 1694) was a Roman Catholic prelate who served as Bishop of Guadalajara (1695–1702).

Biography
Felipe Galindo Chávez y Pineda was born in Veracruz, Mexico and ordained a priest in the Order of Preachers. On May 30, 1695, he was appointed by the King of Spain and confirmed by Pope Innocent XII as Bishop of Guadalajara.

On November 30, 1695, he was consecrated bishop by Manuel Fernández de Santa Cruz y Sahagún, Bishop of Tlaxcala. He served as Bishop of Guadalajara until his death on March 7, 1702.

See also
Catholic Church in Mexico

References

External links and additional sources
 (for Chronology of Bishops)
 (for Chronology of Bishops)

1632 births
1702 deaths
Bishops appointed by Pope Innocent XII
Dominican bishops
17th-century Roman Catholic bishops in Mexico